Neu! 75 is the third studio album by the krautrock band Neu!. It was recorded and mixed at Conny Plank's studio between December 1974 and January 1975. It was released in 1975 by Brain Records, and officially reissued on CD on 29 May 2001 by Astralwerks in the US and by Grönland Records in the UK.

Overview
This album saw Neu! regroup after a few years' break, during which time Michael Rother had worked together with Cluster in the krautrock supergroup Harmonia.

By this time, Rother and bandmate Klaus Dinger had somewhat diverged in their musical intentions for the band, Dinger preferring a more aggressive, rock-influenced style than Rother's ambient predilections. As a result, they agreed to a compromise: Side 1 of the record was recorded in the old Neu! style, as a duo, with Dinger playing drums. For the pieces on side 2, Dinger switched to guitar and lead vocals, recruiting his brother Thomas and Hans Lampe to play drums (simultaneously).

The result is essentially a split record, subtly melodic in the first half and boldly unconventional in the second. On both sides, the use of keyboards and phasing is increased compared to earlier records. Dinger's rock song "Hero" was an inspiration for many musicians of the time, including John Lydon of the Sex Pistols, and is since considered an example of proto-punk. David Bowie alluded to the album on his "Heroes" album.  The band Negativland (named after a song on their first album) named their record label Seeland after the song on '75. Fact described the album's sound "spartan psych-rock set to power driven drum tracks." while Thomas Jerome Seabrook labeled it a  kosmische musik album.

Reception

In 1979, NME critic Andy Gill reviewed the album, stating that "Neu took the repetitive pulse of rock, stretched it out and wove lush, shifting layers of sound over the framework to produce a distinctive, hypnotic music which, whilst undeniably rock, was definitely outside-looking-in." and that "this strain which reaches full fruition on Neu '75, and it's because of this that the album's so pivotally important". The review referred to the tracks "Hero", "E-Musik" and "After Eight" as "damn-near perfect as makes no difference, an achievement which exhausts superlatives". Gill called the track "Hero" "magnificent", comparing it to "Brown Sugar" or Bob Seger's "Rosalie". Gill assessed "Isi", "Seeland" and "Leb' Wohl'" as "less immediate but only slightly less satisfying: evocative, entropic, hot-summer-daze music which balances — and is even more successfully "ambient" than — side two's sweaty nightclub pulse".

Ben Sisario of The New York Times described the album and its predecessors as "landmarks of German experimental rock," also referred to by journalists as krautrock.

Track listing

Personnel 
Neu!
 Michael Rother – guitar, keyboards, vocals
 Klaus Dinger – drums (side 1), guitar (side 2), vocals (side 2)
 Thomas Dinger – drums (side 2)
 Hans Lampe – drums (side 2)

Additional personnel
 Konrad "Conny" Plank – producer, engineer

References

External links 
 Discogs

1975 albums
Neu! albums
Albums produced by Conny Plank